Bunia is a genus of lace bugs in the family Tingidae. There are about six described species in Bunia.

Species
These six species belong to the genus Bunia:
 Bunia halleriae (Duarte Rodrigues, 1982)
 Bunia ituriensis Schouteden, 1955
 Bunia malagasy Duarte Rodrigues, 1992
 Bunia milleri (Drake, 1954)
 Bunia pugnana (Drake, 1954)
 Bunia ralla (Drake, 1963)

References

Further reading

 
 
 
 
 
 
 
 
 
 
 

Tingidae
Articles created by Qbugbot